This list of nautiloids is a comprehensive listing of all genera that have ever been included in the subclass Nautiloidea, excluding purely vernacular terms. The list includes all commonly accepted genera, but also genera that are now considered invalid, doubtful (nomina dubia), or were not formally published (nomina nuda), as well as junior synonyms of more established names, and genera that are no longer considered nautiloids.

Most of the listed genera are found in Part K of the Treatise on Invertebrate Paleontology. Some, added since the year of publication (1964) are found simply in various scientific journals and special publications. The named genera are based on type specimens which are housed in various museums and other academic institutions worldwide, available to interested researchers.

Note that Allonautilus and Nautilus are the only extant genera.

A

†Acanthonautilus
†Acaroceras
†Acleistoceras
†Acrosphaerorthoceras
†Actinoceras
†Actinomorpha
†Adamsoceras
†Adeloceras
†Adelphoceras
†Adnatoceras
†Aethiosolen
†Aethoceras
†Agrioceras
†Aigoceras
†Aipetoceras
†Aipoceras
†Akroceras
†Aktjubocheilus
†Alaskoceras
†Albertoceras
†Alethynoceras
†Aletoceras
†Alexandronautilus
†Allanoceras
†Alloceras
†Allotrioceras
†Allumettoceras
†Almaloceras
†Alpenoceras
†Aluveroceras
†Amphicyrtoceras
†Amsleroceras
†Anamesoceras
†Anaspyroceras
†Anastomoceras
†Ancistroceras
†Andreioceras
†Anepheloceras
†Angaroceras
†Angelinoceras
†Anglicornus
†Anglonautlis
†Anguloceras
†Anhuiceras
†Ankyloceras
†Annoceras
†Anomaloceras
†Anomeioceras
†Anonymoceras
†Anoploceras
†Antacaroceras
†Anthoceras
†Anthomorpha
†Antigyroceras
†Antiphragmoceras
†Antiplectoceras
†Antonoceras
†Aphelaeceras
†Aphetoceras
†Aphractus
†Aphragmites
†Aphyctoceras
†Apioceras
†Aploceras
†Apocrinoceras
†Apogonoceras
†Apsidoceras
†Archiacoceras
†Argocheilus
†Arionoceras
†Arkoceras
†Arkonoceras
†Armenoceras
†Arpaoceras
†Arterioceras
†Arthrophyllum
†Articheilus
†Asaphiceras
†Asbestoceras
†Ascoceras
†Askeatonolucidum
†Astoceras
†Asymptoceras
†Athanatoceras
†Atomoceras
†Atopoceras
†Aturia
†Aturoidea
†Augustoceras
†Aulaconautilus
†Aulametacoceras
†Austinoceras
†Avilionella
†Avoceras

B

†Bactroceras
†Badouceras
†Baeopleuroceras
†Bakeroceras
†Balashovia
†Balticoceras
†Baltoceras
†Bambusoceras
†Barnesoceras
†Barrandeoceras
†Bassleroceras
†Bastindoceras
†Bateroboceras
†Bathmoceras
†Baykonaroceras
†Beekmanoceras
†Belloceras
†Beloitoceras
†Bentoceras
†Bergoceras
†Bickmorites
†Bifoveoceras
†Billingsites
†Bistrialites
†Bitaunioceras
†Blakeoceras
†Blastocerina
†Bodieceras
†Bodoceras
†Bogoslovskya
†Bohemites
†Bolloceras
†Brachycycloceras
†Brachydomoceras
†Bradfordoceras
†Brevicoceras
†Bridgeoceras
†Brodekoceras
†Broeggeroceras
†Buchanoceras
†Buehleroceras
†Burenoceras
†Buttsoceras
†Byronoceras

C

†Calchasiceras
†Calhounoceras
†Callaionautilus
†Calocyrtoceras
†Cameroceras
†Campbelloceras
†Campendoceras
†Campyloceras
†Capriocornites
†Carbactinoceras
†Carinonautilus
†Carlloceras
†Carotites
†Cartersoceras
†Caseoceras
†Cassinoceras
†Casteroceras
†Catastroboceras
†Catoraphinoceras
†Catyrephoceras
†Cayogoceras
†Cayutoceras
†Cedarvilleoceras
†Celox
†Cenoceras
†Centroceras
†Centrocyrtoceras
†Centrocyrtocerina
†Centrolitoceras
†Centroonoceras
†Centrorizoceras
†Centrotarphyceras
†Chabactoceras
†Chadwickoceras
†Charactoceras
†Charactocerina
†Chazyoceras
†Chepuloceras
†Chicagooceras
†Chidleyenoceras
†Chisloceras
†Choanoceras
†Chouteauoceras
†Chrysoceras
†Chuticeras
†Cimonia
†Cinctoceras
†Clarkesvillia
†Clarkoceras
†Clathroceras
†Clelandoceras
†Cliftonoceras
†Clinoceras
†Clionyssiceras
†Clitendoceras
†Clydonautilus
†Clymenonautilus
†Clytoceras
†Cochlioceras
†Codoceras
†Coelocyrtoceras
†Coelogasteroceras
†Coloceras
†Columenoceras
†Comaroceras
†Condraoceras
†Conocerina
†Conostichoceras
†Conradoceras
†Cooperoceras
†Copiceras
†Coralloceras
†Corbuloceras
†Cornuella
†Corysoceras
†Cosmonautilus
†Cotteroceras
†Craftonoceras
†Cranoceras
†Crateroceras
†Cryptocycloceras
†Cryptorthoceras
†Ctenoceras
†Cumberloceras
†Cumingsoceras
†Curtoceras
†Cycloceras
†Cyclolituites
†Cyclopites
†Cycloplectoceras
†Cyclostomiceras
†Cymatoceras
†Cymatonautilus
†Cyrtactinoceras
†Cyrthoceratites
†Cyrtobaltoceras
†Cyrtoceras
†Cyrtoceratites
†Cyrtocerina
†Cyrtocheilus
†Cyrtogomphoceras
†Cyrtogomphus
†Cyrtonybyoceras
†Cyrtorizoceras
†Cyrtospyroceras
†Cyrtothoracoceras

D

†Dakeoceras
†Dalecarlioceras
†Danaoceras
†Danoceras
†Danzikoceras
†Dasbergoceras
†Dawsonoceras
†Dawsonocerina
†Deckeroceras
†Deiloceras
†Deinoceras
†Deiroceras
†Deltoceras
†Deltocymatoceras
†Deltoidonautilus
†Dentoceras
†Desioceras
†Devonocheilus
†Diademoceras
†Diagoceras
†Diaphoroceras
†Diastoloceras
†Dictyoceras
†Dideroceras
†Diestoceras
†Digenuoceras
†Diodoceras
†Diorugoceras
†Discitoceras
†Discoactinoceras
†Discoceras
†Discosorus
†Dnestroceras
†Doleroceras
†Dolorthoceras
†Domatoceras
†Dongshanoceras
†Dowlingoceras
†Drakonoceras
†Duerleyoceras
†Dunleithoceras
†Dwightoceras
†Dynatoceras
†Dyscritoceras
†Dzhinsetoceras

E

†Eburoceras
†Ecdyceras
†Ectenoceras
†Ectenolites
†Ectocycloceras
†Ectocyrtoceras
†Edaphoceras
†Edenoceras
†Ehlersoceras
†Eichwaldoceras
†Eifeloceras
†Ekwanoceras
†Elaphoceras
†Eldroceras
†Eleusoceras
†Elkanoceras
†Ellesmeroceras
†Ellinoceras
†Elpisoceras
†Elrodoceras
†Encoiloceras
†Endoceras
†Endocycloceras
†Endodiscosorus
†Endolobus
†Endoplanoceras
†Endoplectoceras
†Endorioceras
†Endostokesoceras
†Engorthoceras
†Enoploceras
†Entimoceras
†Eoclarkoceras
†Eocyckistomiceras
†Eocyrtoceras
†Eodiaphragmoceras
†Eoectenolites
†Eorizoceras
†Eosomichelinoceras
†Eothinoceras
†Eotrimeroceras
†Eotripteroceras
†Ephippioceras
†Ephippiorthoceras
†Epicymatoceras
†Epidomatoceras
†Epistroboceras
†Eremoceras
†Eridites
†Eskimoceras
†Esopoceras
†Estonioceras
†Euciphoceras
†Eucymatoceras
†Eudoceras
†Euloxoceras
†Euryrizoceras
†Eurystomites
†Eushantungoceras
†Eusthenoceras
†Eutrephoceras
†Evlanoceras
†Exochoceras
†Exocyrtoceras

F

†Faberoceras
†Fayettoceras
†Flowerites
†Floweroceras
†Foersteoceras
†Folioceras
†Foordiceras
†Franklinoceras
†Fremontoceras
†Fusicoceras

G

†Galtoceras
†Gangshanoceras
†Garryoceras
†Gasconsoceras
†Gaspocyrtoceras
†Geisonoceras
†Geisonocerina
†Geisonoceroides
†Geitonoceras
†Georgina
†Germanonautilus
†Glenisteroceras
†Glossoceras
†Glyptodendron
†Goldringia
†Gomphoceras
†Gonatocyrtoceras
†Gonioceras
†Gonionaedyceras
†Gonionautilus
†Gorbyoceras
†Gordonoceras
†Gorgonoceras
†Gouldoceras
†Graciloceras
†Graftonoceras
†Greenlandoceras
†Grimsbyoceras
†Grypoceras
†Gryponautilus
†Grzegorzewskia
†Guangyuanoceras
†Guangyuanoceroides
†Gyroceras
†Gyronaedyceras
†Gzheloceras

H

†Hadoceras
†Halloceras
†Hardmanoceras
†Harrisoceras
†Haruspex
†Haydenoceras
†Hebetoceras
†Hecatoceras
†Hedstroemoceras
†Helenites
†Heloceras
†Hemibeloitoceras
†Hemichoanella
†Hemicosmorthoceras
†Hemiliroceras 
†Heminautilus
†Hemiphragmoceras
†Heracloceras
†Hercoceras
†Hercocyrtoceras
†Hercoglossa
†Hercoglossoceras
†Herkimeroceras
†Hesperoceras
†Hexagonites
†Hexameroceras
†Hindeoceras
†Hipparionoceras
†Hiregiroceras
†Hoeloceras
†Holconautilus
†Holmiceras
†Homaloceras
†Homoadelphoceras
†Huaiheceras
†Huanghuachangoceras
†Huiaihecerina
†Hunanoceras
†Hunyuenoceras
†Huronia
†Huroniella
†Hysteroceras

I

†Inclytoceras
†Indonautilus
†Inversoceras
†Iowoceras
†Irianoceras
†Irinites
†Isorthoceras

J

†Jangziceras
†Jaregoceras
†Jasperoceras
†Jiagouceras
†Joachimoceras
†Joldagiroceras
†Jolietoceras
†Jonesoceras
†Jovellania
†Juvavionautilus

K

†Kadaroceras
†Kallholnoceras
†Karadzharoceras
†Karoceras
†Katageioceras
†Kayoceras
†Kentlandoceras
†Keraiaceras
†Kiaeroceras
†Kijoceras
†Kyminoceras
†Kinaschukoceras
†Kindleoceras
†Kionoceras
†Kitatites
†Kladisoceras
†Knightoceras
†Kobyashiceras
†Kochoceras
†Konglungenoceras
†Kophinoceras
†Kosovoceras
†Kotelnyoceras
†Krykyloceras
†Kummeloceras
†Kundoceras
†Kyminoceras

L

†Lambeoceras
†Lamellorthoceras
†Landeroceras
†Laumontoceras
†Laureloceras
†Lavaloceras
†Lawrenceoceras
†Lechritrochoceras
†Leonardoceras
†Leuroceras
†Leurocycloceras
†Leurorthoceras
†Leurotrochoceras
†Levisoceras
†Librovitschiceras
†Linstroemoceras
†Liroceras
†Lispoceras
†Litoceras
†Litogyroceras
†Lituites
†Llanoceras
†Lobendoceras
†Loganoceras
†Lophoceras
†Lopingoceras
†Lorieroceras
†Lowoceras
†Loxoceras
†Lunanoceras
†Lychnoceras
†Lyckholmoceras
†Lyecoceras
†Lyrioceras
†Lysagoroceras
†Lysagoroceras

M

†Maccoyoceras
†Macrodomoceras
†Macroloxoceras
†Madiganella
†Maelonoceras
†Magdoceras
†Mahoningoceras
†Mandaloceras
†Manitoulinoceras
†Manjoceras
†Mariceras
†Mcqueenoceras
†Mecynoceras
†Megadisocosorus
†Megaglossoceras
†Megaloceras
†Meikeloceras
†Meitanoceras
†Meloceras
†Meniscoceras
†Menuthionautlis
†Mericoceras
†Mesaktoceras
†Mesnaquaceras
†Mesoceras
†Mesochasmoceras
†Metabaltoceras
†Metacoceras
†Metactinoceras
†Metaphragmoceras
†Metarizoceras
†Metarmenoceras
†Metaspyroceras
†Metastromatoceras
†Metephippiorthoceras
†Metrioceras
†Miamoceras
†Michelinoceras
†Microbaltoceras
†Micronoceras
†Millkoninckioceras
†Mimolychnoceras
†Minganoceras
†Mitorthoceras
†Mitroceras
†Mixosiphonoceras
†Mjandymoceras
†Mnemoceras
†Mojscaroceras
†Mongoceras
†Monocyrtoceras
†Monogonoceras
†Monomuchites
†Montyoceras
†Mooreoceras
†Moreauoceras
†Mosquoceras
†Mstikhinoceras
†Muiroceras
†Multicameroceras
†Murchisoniceras
†Muriceras
†Murrayoceras
†Myloceras
†Mysterioceras

N

†Naedyceras
†Najaceras
†Nanno
†Nassauoceras
†Nautiloceras
†Nebroceras
†Neobistrialites
†Neoceras
†Neocycloceras
†Neocymatoceras
†Neodiscosorus
†Neodomatoceras
†Neorthoceras
†Neosichuanoceras
†Nephriticeras
†Nephriticerina
†Neptunoceras
†Neumatoceras
†Nikenautilus
†Nipageroceras
†Nothoceras
†Notocycloceras
†Nucites
†Nybyoceras

O

†Octamerella
†Oelandoceras
†Offleyoceras
†Ogygoceras
†Ohioceras
†Oligoceras
†Oncoceras
†Oneotoceras
†Onyxites
†Oocerina
†Oonoceras
†Ophidioceras
†Ophioceras
†Ophionautilus
†Oratoceras
†Ordosoceras
†Ormoceras
†Orthoceras
†Orthocycloceras
†Orthonybyoceras
†Osbornoceras
†Ovoceras
†Ovocerina
†Oxfordoceras
†Oxygonioceras
†Oxynautilus

P

†Pachendoceras
†Pachtoceras
†Pakrioceras
†Palaeocycloceras
†Palaskensis
†Palelialia
†Palmeroceras
†Pancornus
†Pantoioceras
†Paquettoceras
†Paracenoceras
†Paracleistoceras
†Paraconradoceras
†Paractinoceras
†Paracyclostomiceras
†Paracymatoceras
†Paradakeoceras
†Paradiscoceras
†Paradnatoceras
†Paradomatoceras
†Parakionoceras
†Paraloxoceras
†Paramecynoceras
†Parametacoceras
†Paramooreoceras
†Paranautilus
†Parapalaeoceras
†Paraphragmites
†Paraplectronoceras
†Pararhiphaeoceras
†Pararineceras
†Parascoceras
†Parasphaerorthoceras
†Parastenopoceras
†Paratrematoceras
†Parawestonoceras
†Parevlanoceras
†Paroocerina
†Parormoceras
†Parryoceras
†Pectinoceras
†Peismoceras
†Pelagoceras
†Pentameroceras
†Perimecoceras
†Perioidanoceras
†Peripetoceras
†Permoceras
†Permodomatoceras
†Permonautilus
†Perunautilus
†Petryoceras
†Phacoceras
†Phaedrysmocheilus
†Phloioceras
†Phragmoceras
†Phragmocerina
†Phthanoncoceras
†Physioceras
†Pictetoceras
†Piersaloceras
†Pilotoceras
†Pionoceras
†Piratoceras
†Plagioceras
†Plagiostomoceras
†Planetoceras
†Platyconoceras
†Plectoceras
†Plectolites
†Pleuronautilus
†Pleuroncoceras
†Pleurorthoceras
†Plicatoceras
†Plummeroceras
†Podoliceras
†Polydesmia
†Polyelasmoceras
†Polygrammoceras
†Poterioceras
†Poteriocerina
†Potoceras
†Pristeroceras
†Probillingsites
†Proclydonautilus
†Procymatoceras
†Projovellania
†Proteoceras
†Proterocameroceras
†Proterovaginoceras
†Protobactrites
†Protocycloceras
†Protokionoceras
†Protophragmoceras
†Pselioceras
†Pseudactinoceras
†Pseudaganides
†Pseudancistroceras
†Pseudaturoidea
†Pseudendoceras
†Pseudobolloceras
†Pseudobrevicoceras
†Pseudocatastroboceras
†Pseudocenoceras
†Pseudocycloceras
†Pseudocyrtoceras
†Pseudogomphoceras
†Pseudokionoceras
†Pseudonautilus
†Pseudophacoceras
†Pseudophragmoceras
†Pseudorthoceras
†Pseudostenopoceras
†Pseudotemnocheilus
†Pseudotemperoceras
†Pseudotitanoceras
†Psiaoceras
†Ptenoceras
†Ptyssoceras
†Purmanarcoceras
†Pycnoceras
†Pyramidoceras
†Pythonoceras

Q

†Qiushougouceras
†Quebecoceras

R

†Radoceras
†Ramussenoceras
†Rangeroceras
†Raphanites
†Rasmussenoceras
†Rayonnoceras
†Rectseptoceras
†Redpathoceras
†Reedsoceras
†Reticycloceras
†Rhabdiferoceras
†Rhabdites
†Rhadinoceras
†Rhiphaeoceras
†Rhiphaeonautilus
†Rhipsites
†Rhomboceras
†Rhomboceras
†Rhynchoceras
†Rhynchorthoceras
†Richardsonoceras
†Rineceras
†Ringoceras
†Rioceras
†Rizoceras
†Robsonoceras
†Romingoceras
†Ropaloceras
†Roussanoffoceras
†Rudolfoceras
†Ruedemannoceras
†Ruthenoceras
†Rutoceras

S

†Sactoceras
†Sactorthoceras
†Saffordoceras
†Savageoceras
†Sceptrites
†Schroederoceras
†Schuchertoceras
†Scofieldoceras
†Scyphoceras
†Seelyoceras
†Selenoceras
†Selkirkoceras
†Shamattawaceras
†Shantungendoceras
†Shideleroceras
†Shikhanoceras
†Sholakoceras
†Shumardoceras
†Shuranoceras
†Siberioceras
†Siberionautilus
†Sibyllonautilus
†Sichuanaceras
†Sigmocycloceras
†Simardoceras
†Simorthoceras
†Simplicioceras
†Sinclairoceras
†Sinoceras
†Sinolebetoceras
†Slocomoceras
†Smileoceras
†Smithvilloceras
†Soakinautilus
†Solenochilus
†Somalinautilus
†Sophoceras
†Spanioceras
†Sphooceras
†Sphyradoceras
†Spondeioceras
†Spyroceras
†Stagonites
†Standardoceras
†Staufferoceras
†Stearoceras
†Stemtonoceras
†Stenogomphoceras
†Stenopoceras
†Stenzeloceras
†Stereoplasmoceras
†Stereospyroceras
†Stereotoceras
†Sthenoceras
†Stokesoceras
†Stolbovoceras
†Strandoceras
†Streptoceras
†Striacoceras
†Strionautilus
†Strobiloceras
†Stroboceras
†Stroggyloceras
†Stromatoceras
†Strophiceras
†Styrionautilus
†Subclymenia
†Subspyroceras
†Subvestinautilus
†Suttonoceras
†Sycoceras
†Synetoceras
†Syringoceras
†Syringonautilus
†Syrionautilus
†Syrreghmatoceras
†Systrophoceras

T

†Tainionautilus
†Tainoceras
†Tajaroceras
†Talattoceras
†Tambegiroceras
†Tanchiashanites
†Tanycameroceras
†Taoqupoceras
†Tarphyceras
†Tartaroceras
†Taskanoceras
†Taxyceras
†Teichertia
†Teichertoceras
†Temnocheilus
†Temperoceras
†Tetragonoceras
†Tetrameroceras
†Tetranodoceras
†Tetrapleuroceras
†Thaymastoceras
†Therioceras
†Theskeloceras
†Thoracoceras
†Threaroceras
†Thrincoceras
†Thuringionautilus
†Tienoceras
†Tirolonautilus
†Titanoceras
†Tithonoceras
†Tofangoceras
†Tomponautilus
†Torquatoceras
†Trachynautilus
†Tragoceras
†Trematoceras
†Trematodiscus
†Tretoceras
†Triboloceras
†Trigonoceras
†Trilacinoceras
†Trimeroceras
†Tripleuroceras
†Triplooceras
†Tripteroceras
†Tripterocerina
†Tripteroceroides
†Trispectes
†Tritonoceras
†Trochoceras
†Trochodictyoceras
†Trocholites
†Trocholitoceras
†Troedssonella
†Troedssonoceras
†Troostoceras
†Tshingizoceras
†Tubiferoceras
†Tumidoceras
†Tumidonautilus
†Tunguskoceras
†Turnoceras
†Turoceras
†Tuyloceras
†Tylodiscoceras
†Tylonautilus
†Tylorthoceras
†Tyrioceras

U

†Ukhtoceras
†Uloceras
†Ulrichoceras
†Umbeloceras
†Ungulites
†Uralorthoceras
†Uranoceras
†Urtasymoceras

V

†Valcouroceras
†Valhallites
†Valhalloceras
†Vasalemmoceras
†Vassaroceras
†Vaupelia
†Venatoroceras
†Veneficoceras
†Ventroloboceras
†Vericeras
†Verticoceras
†Vertorhizoceras
†Vespoceras
†Vestinautilus
†Virgaloceras
†Virgoceras

W

†Wadeoceras
†Walcottoceras
†Wardoceras
†Weberoceras
†Weishanhuceras
†Welleroceras
†Wellsoceras
†Westonoceras
†Whiteavesites
†Whitfieldoceras
†Wichitoceras
†Williamsoceras
†Wilsonoceras
†Winnipegoceras
†Wissenbachia
†Wolungoceras
†Woosteroceras
†Worthenoceras
†Wutinoceras

X

†Xainzanoceras
†Xenoceras
†Xenocheilus
†Xiaoshaoceras
†Xiphoceras

Y

†Yakutionautilus

Z

†Zeehanoceras
†Zerashanoceras
†Zhuibianoceras
†Zhuralevia
†Zittelloceras
†Zooceras

References 

 Uncited genera names can be attributed to Sepkoski (2002)
 
 Sepkoski's Online Genus Database (CEPHALOPODA)

 List of
Lists of prehistoric molluscs
Lists of animal genera (alphabetic)